The Information Minister of the Palestinian National Authority is the minister in charge of election polls, media and has a role in advising the Prime Minister of the Palestinian National Authority. In 2002, the ministry was merged the Culture and Arts Ministry.

List of ministers
Yasser Abed Rabbo - Popular Front for the Liberation of Palestine (1998-April 2003)
Nabil Amr - Fatah (April 2003-October 2003)
Ahmed Qurei - Fatah (November 2003-February 2005)
Nabil Shaath - (February 2005-March 2006)
Yousef Rizqa - Hamas (2006–2007)
Riyad al-Malki - Popular Front for the Liberation of Palestine (July 2007–present)

References

Government ministers of the Palestinian National Authority
Palestine Nat